Djshop Records is a German-based online dance music retail store, selling vinyl records, CDs, music downloads and music accessories, founded by Armin Wirth. The website was created in 1993. In 1998 the site changed into the European commercial franchise store Djshop, with locations in Poland, Vienna, Switzerland, Netherlands and the UK. During the e-commerce boom of the late 1990s, the site differentiated itself from other dance music stores by maintaining a text-based presentation.

In July 2005, Djshop Records added MP3 and WAV downloads to its catalogue. In December 2008, Djshop released the independent digital music upload portal Feiyr that allowed every dj and artist to sell their music in real time in the djshop. In 2011, djshop had over 10,000 labels and artists under contracts.

With the start of 2009 Feiyr began cooperation with several online shops such as iTunes, Amazon and Napster to sell the digital content from the DJs to their shops. One year later djshop closed contracts as the first specialized dance store with the big four major music companies Warner, EMI, Sony BMG to sell the major music content in the djshop. Feiyr and djshop started in 2010 to press individually downloaded files on vinyl.

In November 2010, Djshop released the first mobile dance store in the iTunes app store.
In January 2011 Djshop won the German biggest Poll from Pioneer and the Raveline Magazine (85,000 readers) as the German most wanted download store. Since January 2011 Djshop presents the digital download charts from Germany's biggest DJ mag. Starting in 2011, Djshop released in Germany's biggest underground party magazine Partysan the music charts.

Current sites
 Djshop records – the main international online shop for both physical and digital products, with language support in English and German
 Feiyr – upload your music – international independent music distribution portal

References

External links

Main sites
 Djshop
 Feiyr – Upload Your Music

Other sites
 

Retail companies established in 1993
Online music stores of Germany